WQMF (95.7 FM) is a mainstream rock radio station in Louisville, Kentucky. The station is licensed by the Federal Communications Commission (FCC) to the nearby city of Jeffersonville, Indiana, and broadcasts with an effective radiated power (ERP) of 28.5 kW. The station's studios are in the Louisville enclave of Watterson Park and the transmitter site is near Elizabeth, Indiana, west of the Ohio River. The station is owned by iHeartMedia.

Station history
95.7 signed on as WQHI in April 1974 as HI 95, an automated Top 40 station utilizing TM's "Stereo Rock" format. The first song played when HI 95 signed on was "Oh My My" by Ringo Starr.

In January 1981, WQHI was sold to the Wood family owners of Secret Communications and the people behind WEBN, so the station was changed to a AOR format as 96 FM WQMF. Within a short period of time, QMF was successful in toppling WLRS as the top Album Rock station in the market under Program Director Tom Owens.  Many current well-known Louisville radio personalities appeared on the station. The early years consisted of Ron Clay and Terry Meiners on The Show With No Name. They used this morning show name after departing the morning show at WLRS where their “Morning Sickness” name had been trademarked by WLRS. After Meiners departed, Clay continued his morning run at QMF with Mason Dixon and later Alan Sells. Clay left WQMF in early 1986 for KZAP in Sacramento, CA. Until his return less than a year later. Clay continued his run with “
Uncle Ron's Asylum until his passing in 1991. QMF then hired LRS 102's alum Rocky Knight to launch The Rocky & Troy Morning Show.  Karen Bach-Markins, Duke Meyer, and Future Bob were also on QMF as well.

Their former mascot of WQMF was Wacky T. Weasel, who had the same snickering laugh that Muttley Mutt had on some legendary Hanna-Barbera shows such as Wacky Races, Dastardly & Muttley In Their Flying Machines, Yogi's Treasure Hunt, Fender Bender 500, & Yo Yogi!.

In the mid 1990s, WQMF switched to a classic rock format.

HD programming
On May 11, 2016, WQMF shifted their format from classic rock to mainstream rock and WQMF-HD2 picked up the "Fox" active rock format from sister station WTFX-FM, which flipped to urban.
HD1 is a digital simulcast of the traditional analog broadcast of WQMF.
HD3 is a digital simulcast of sister station WTFX-FM, an urban contemporary format.

References

External links
WQMF's official website
WQMF's page at LKYRadio.com

QMF
QMF
Radio stations established in 1974
IHeartMedia radio stations